Klang is the third and final studio album by English indie rock band The Rakes, released on 23 March 2009. The album was preceded by the first single "1989" on 16 March. The Rakes recorded the album with Chris Zane in Berlin, Germany, a decision that lead singer Alan Donohoe explained is because "The London music scene is so dull--it's like wading through a swamp of shit. We just wanted to be somewhere more inspiring." Hence the name of the album which is the German word for 'sound'.

Track listing
 "You're in It"
 "That's the Reason"
 "The Loneliness of the Outdoor Smoker"
 "Bitchin' in the Kitchin'"
 "The Woes of the Working Woman"
 "1989"
 "Shackleton"
 "The Light from Your Mac"
 "Muller's Ratchet"
 "The Final Hill"
 "Demons" (iTunes Bonus Track)

Personnel

The Rakes
Alan Donohoe – vocals
Jamie Hornsmith – bass guitar
Lasse Petersen – drums
Matthew Swinnerton – lead guitar

Additional musicians
Chris Ketley – guitar, piano

References

The Rakes albums
2009 albums
V2 Records albums